The 2021 Norwich City Council election took place on 6 May 2021 to elect members of Norwich City Council in England. This was on the same day as other local elections. 13 of 39 seats (one-third) were up for election.

Results summary

Ward results

The ward results for Norwich City Council were released on 8 May 2021.

The election in Sewell ward was postponed to 17 June 2021 due to the death of a candidate standing in that ward.

Bowthorpe

Catton Grove

Crome

Eaton

Lakenham

Mancroft

Mile Cross

Nelson

Sewell
The election for the Sewell ward was postponed until 17 June 2021 following the death of the Conservative candidate, Eve Collishaw.

Thorpe Hamlet

Town Close

University

Wensum

References

Norwich
2021
2020s in Norfolk
May 2021 events in the United Kingdom